Andreea-Cristiana Navrotescu (born 21 December 1996) is a French chess player who holds the FIDE title of Woman International Master (WIM, 2016). She is a Women's Chess Olympiad individual silver medalist (2016).

Biography
Navrotescu six times won French Youth Chess Championships in various girl's age group. In 2012, in Prague she won bronze medal in European Youth Chess Championship in girl's U16 age group.

She played for France in the Women's Chess Olympiad:
 In 2016, at reserve board in the 42nd Chess Olympiad (women) in Baku (+6, =2, -2) and won individual silver medal.

Navrotescu played for France in the European Women's Team Chess Championship:
 In 2019, at fourth board in the 22nd European Team Chess Championship (women) in Batumi (+4, =0, -3).
In 2022, she won the 53rd Belgrade WGM tournament with a score of 7/9

She received the Woman FIDE Master (WFM) title in 2012 and the FIDE Woman International Master (WIM) title in 2016.

References

External links
 
 
 

1996 births
Living people
French female chess players
Chess Woman International Masters
Chess Olympiad competitors